2001 Collegiate Draft of Major League Lacrosse 

Major League Lacrosse Collegiate Draft
Major League Lacrosse